Spectrum Pharmaceuticals is an American biopharmaceutical company. The company is located in Boston, MA.

Drugs

Spectrum develops and markets drugs for treatments in hematology and oncology.

In January 2019, Spectrum sold off its entire commercial portfolio of seven marketed hematology/oncology products to Acrotech Biopharma USA Inc., a New Jersey-based subsidiary of Aurobindo Pharma Limited in India.

The seven products sold were Fusilev (levoleucovorin), Folotyn (pralatexate injection), Zevalin (ibritumomab tiuxetan), Marqibo (vincristine sulfate LIPOSOME injection), Beleodaq (belinostat) for injection, Evomela (melphalan) for injection, and Khapzory (levoleucovorin).

The seven drugs had a combined sales of $76.4 million in the first three quarters of 2018.

The divestiture of seven marketed products infused non-dilutive capital back into the organization and enabled Spectrum to further advance its two cornerstone, value driving assets.

In development
As of 2023, Spectrum has one FDA approved drug (ROLVEDON™  (eflapegrastim) is also formerly known as Rolontis) and one drug in advanced development (Poziotinib).

Key Events for Rolvedon

On September 9, 2022, FDA approved ROLVEDON™ (formerly known as Rolontis)(eflapegrastim-xnst) injection indicated to decrease the incidence of infection, as manifested by febrile neutropenia, in adult patients with non-myeloid malignancies receiving myelosuppressive anti-cancer drugs associated with clinically significant incidence of febrile neutropenia.

Development timeline for Rolvedon:

Sep  9, 2022 Spectrum announced FDA Approval of Rolvedon (eflapegrastim-xnst) Injection to Decrease the Incidence of Chemotherapy-Induced Neutropenia

April 11, 2022 FDA announced acceptance of Spectrum's re-submission of its Rolontis Biologics License Application (BLA)to FDA.

Aug  6, 2021	
Spectrum received a Complete Response Letter (CRL) from FDA for Rolontis (eflapegrastim).
FDA cited to manufacturing deficiencies that required the manufacturing facilities to be re-inspected by FDA.

Oct. 24, 2019  
Spectrum re-submitted an updated version of its Biologics License Application (BLA)for ROLONTIS (eflapegrastim) to FDA based on 643 early-stage breast cancer patients. This BLA version included additional information in the Chemistry, Manufacturing and Controls (CMC) section.

Mar 18, 2019   
After receiving FDA's request for additional (CMC) chemistry-manufacturing-control related information for Rolontis (eflapegrastim), Spectrum voluntarily withdrew its 2018 Biologics License Application (BLA) from FDA as more than 60 days time would have beenneeded to provide the additional CMC-related information FDA required before March 29, 2019, the end date of FDA's initial 60-day review period.

Dec 27, 2018
Spectrum announced its submission of the Biologics License Application to the FDA for Rolontis (eflapegrastim) as a Treatment for Chemotherapy-Induced Neutropenia based on 643 early-stage breast cancer patients.

Key Research and Development Events for Poziotinib

Poziotinib is a tyrosine kinase inhibitor in development for use in patients with previously treated locally advanced or metastatic non-small cell lung cancer (NSCLC) with HER2 exon 20 insertion mutations.

Nov 28, 2022 
Spectrum announced the lay off 75% of R&D staff after FDA New Drug Application (NDA) rejection. Spectrum also announced plans to discontinue development of poziotinib, and to explore “strategic alternatives” for the Poziotinib program.

Nov 25, 2022	
Spectrum received a Complete Response Letter from FDA for Poziotinib.

Sep 22, 2022	
Spectrum provided an update on Poziotinib following the FDA Oncologic Drugs Advisory Committee (ODAC) Meeting regarding Spectrum's New Drug Application (NDA).

The ODAC voted 9–4 against a Poziotinib approval as the advisers judged the drug's risks outweighed its benefits.

Feb 11, 2022	
Spectrum announced FDA acceptance of the New Drug Application (NDA) submitted for Poziotinib

Dec  6, 2021	
Spectrum submitted the New Drug Application (NDA) for Poziotinib.

Mar 11, 2021	
FDA Grants Fast Track Designation (FTD) to Spectrum for Poziotinib.

Dec 19, 2018 
Spectrum announced that based on a subset of data from MD Anderson's ongoing Phase 2 study, FDA did not grant Breakthrough Therapy Designation (BTD) to Poziotinib for the treatment of patients with metastatic non-small cell lung cancer (NSCLC) whose tumors have EGFR exon 20 mutations.

Spectrum's BTD application included data from 30 patients from MD Anderson's  Phase 2 study who had failed platinum-based chemotherapy.

Spectrum reported that the MDAnderson data demonstrated a confirmed objective response rate of 40% and median duration of response of 6.6 months.

Spectrum stated the safety profile in this subset was consistent with historical data published on poziotinib and other tyrosine kinase inhibitors. The historical objective response rates for mutation specific NSCLC patients range between 0% and 8% with tyrosine kinase inhibitors and for non-mutation specific NSCLC patients range between 0.8% and 22.9% with other treatments.

2018 Spectrum submits Poziotinib application for Breakthrough Therapy Designation (BTD) to FDA based on data reported on patients treated by John Heymach, MD and medical staff at the MD Anderson Cancer Center.

Sep 24, 2018	
Spectrum Announced the release of updated Poziotinib data From MD Anderson's Phase 2 Study in Non-Small Cell Lung Cancer Patients.

May 3, 2018 
Patent Licensing Agreement announced by and between The University of Texas MD Anderson Cancer Center (MDACC) and Spectrum Pharmaceuticals to cover discoveries by John Heymach, M.D., Ph.D., professor and chair of Thoracic/Head and Neck Medical Oncology, and Heymach's research staff at MDACC in the future.

The filed patents, if granted, are expected to extend the intellectual property protection to 2037.

Oct 27, 2017 
Spectrum highlights Poziotinib Data in Non-Small-Cell Lung Cancer (NSCLC) from research results reported by Dr. John Heymach and The University of Texas MD Anderson Cancer Center.

At the 18th IASLC World Conference on Lung Cancer in Japan, Spectrum presented data reported by Dr. Heymach and the MD Anderson Cancer Center research team illustrating that Poziotinib demonstrated evidence of significant antitumor activity in NSCLC patients with EGFR exon 20 insertion mutations, with interim data showing an Objective Response Rate of 73%.

Evidence of central nervous system (CNS) activity in a patient with CNS metastasis and another with leptomeningeal disease (LMD).

March 17, 2017 
First Poziotinib clinical trial patient enrolled by Dr. John Heymach of MD Anderson Cancer Center into the Investigator Study Protocol 2016–0783.

Feb. 23, 2017
Dr. John Heymach of M.D. Anderson Cancer Center initiated the Investigator IND as the Study Sponsor to of the clinical research, Protocol 2016–0783, “A Phase II Study of Poziotinib in EGFR or HER2 Mutant Advanced Solid Tumors” in collaboration with Spectrum and National Cancer Institute (NCI).

References

External links

Biotechnology companies of the United States
Pharmaceutical companies of the United States
Companies listed on the Nasdaq
Companies based in Henderson, Nevada
Orphan drug companies
Life sciences industry
Health care companies based in Nevada